Ernst Winkler (born 11 March 1955) is a former Austrian alpine skier.

Career
During his career he has achieved 14 results among the top 10 (4 podiums) in the World Cup.

World Cup results
Podiums

References

External links
 
 

1955 births
Living people
Austrian male alpine skiers